Sciatic notch may refer to :

 Greater sciatic notch
 Lesser sciatic notch